Goodrich is a village in south Herefordshire, England close to Gloucestershire and the Forest of Dean, situated near the River Wye at . It is known for its  Norman and mediaeval castle built with Old Red Sandstone.

The village of Goodrich grew up next to Goodrich Castle, a 'Marcher Castle' dating to c. 1101 which stands on a high spur of land commanding a strategic position above Kerne Bridge, an ancient crossing point of the Wye. The population of the Civil Parish at the 2011 census was 550.

Village 
 
Goodrich is close to the A40 trunk road which forms part of the main route between South Wales and the West Midlands but is in a sheltered rural location. Goodrich has not retained its village shop or post office but has kept hold of a village hall and two public houses. The village has a tennis club with three all-weather courts and an active village cricket club.

The Coppett hill nature reserve stretches along a hill above the Wye south of Goodrich.

Church

The Church of St Giles contains the tomb (an altar tomb on the left side of the altar, plain with no inscription or effigy) of the Countess of Salisbury, who was charged by Henry Bolingbroke with bringing up his son, later to become King Henry V, after the death of Mary de Bohun his first wife. The young boy was brought up at nearby Courtfield at Welsh Bicknor.

Goodrich Castle 

Goodrich Castle was first known as Castellum Godrici after Godric of Mappestone, the builder of the first castle on the site.  Over time the name changed to Goodrich and the castle changed hands many times through the centuries, passing from family to family.  In 1646, near the end of the English civil war, the castle was besieged and captured, using a cannon cast in the Forest of Dean called Roaring Meg, from Sir Henry Lingen by Parliamentarians led by Colonel Birch.  The castle is now in the care of English Heritage.

Goodrich Court

Goodrich was also the location of Goodrich Court, built between 1828 and 1831 by Sir Samuel Meyrick. Goodrich Court and other nearby buildings became the evacuation home to Felsted School in the World War II years 1940–1945. Although demolished in the 1950s, Goodrich Court Stables and its walled garden still exists; Sculptor Jon Edgar lived and worked here between 2004 and 2007. The history of Goodrich Court is documented in a book by Rosalind Lowe. The author lives in the area in a house once owned by Sir Samuel Meyrick, whose collection of armoury forms the core of the original Wallace Collection.

Rocklands House

Rocklands House is listed on the English Heritage Register. It was built in the 1700s and substantial additions were made in 1800 It was the home of many notable people over the next two centuries.

Role in history of aesthetics

Goodrich's prominent position overlooking the River Wye meant that both Castle and Court were stopping points on the first Wye Tour of William Gilpin in 1770. The trip from Ross-on-Wye to Monmouth was instrumental in the development of The Picturesque and Picturesque Tourism.

Railways
The village was served by the Ross and Monmouth Railway at Kerne Bridge station between 1873 and 1959 running through the scenic Wye Valley.

References

External links

 Goodrich Castle on English Heritage website
 The Destruction of Goodrich Castle, Historic HerefordshireOnline
 Geograph : photographs of Goodrich and surrounding area
 Sir Samuel Meyrick and Goodrich Court
 Repicturing the Picturesque; following Sir William Gilpin's 1770 tour

Villages in Herefordshire